Tim Krumpen (born November 28, 1988) is a German retired footballer who played as a goalkeeper.

He made his debut for the club in May 2011, as a substitute for Sergiu Radu in a 2. Bundesliga match against Fortuna Düsseldorf, after David Hohs had been sent off. Krumpen announced his retirement from football in summer 2013.

External links

1988 births
Living people
German footballers
Alemannia Aachen players
2. Bundesliga players
3. Liga players
Sportspeople from Aachen
Association football goalkeepers
Footballers from North Rhine-Westphalia